Jaycee Park is a ballpark located in Plainview, Texas and was the home to the Plainview Ponies and the Plainview Athletics. The field has also been used for UIL games over the years.

Sources
 "Texas Almanac 2008–2009", The Dallas Morning News, c.2008

References

Baseball venues in Texas